"Play That Song" is a song by American rock band Train. It was released on September 29, 2016, as the lead single from their tenth studio album A Girl, a Bottle, a Boat (2017). The song peaked at number 41 on the US Billboard Hot 100. It has been certified double platinum by the ARIA and the RIAA, and gold by Music Canada and the British Phonographic Industry.

Composition
The song incorporates the melody of "Heart and Soul", written by Hoagy Carmichael and Frank Loesser. They are credited as writers, alongside Train lead singer Patrick Monahan and producer William Wiik Larsen. The song samples "Heart and Soul".

Music video
A music video to accompany the release of "Play That Song" was first released onto YouTube on November 18, 2016. It shows Monahan dancing through Los Angeles on a warm sunny day, accompanied by many friendly strangers. At one point, Monahan dances on a large piano keyboard, evoking a scene from Big. The video was shot at Los Angeles' Grand Park. At the end of the video, Monahan is shown walking into a building with signage indicating that it is "KTRN Radio Station"; over the glass entry door is stenciled "KTRN Premium Radio".  Then just before a reprise of the song's chorus, a radio announcer, heard through a large boom box being held up by the crowd, says that "Play That Song" will be played due to "..all the requests coming in".  The call letters reference an actual, active radio station, 104.5 KTRN, known, quite appropriately to the video as K-Train; the only anomaly is that the station is located far from the video's Los Angeles setting in Pine Bluff, Arkansas.

Charts

Weekly charts

Year-end charts

Certifications and sales

Release history

References

2016 songs
2016 singles
Songs about music
Train (band) songs
Columbia Records singles
Songs written by William Wiik Larsen
Songs written by Pat Monahan
Songs with music by Hoagy Carmichael
Songs written by Frank Loesser